Alice Jones is an American international swimmer who swam for the Cincinnati Marlins.

At the 1970 Amateur Athletic Union (AAU) Outdoor Swimming Championships, Jones won two gold medals, setting world records in the 100- and 200-meter butterfly. The next summer, at the 1971 Pan American Games, she won a silver medal in the 200-meter butterfly. She was named World Swimmer of the Year in 1970 by Swimming World.

Jones attended the University of Cincinnati.

References

Living people
Year of birth missing (living people)
Place of birth missing (living people)
American female butterfly swimmers
World record setters in swimming
Swimmers at the 1971 Pan American Games
Pan American Games silver medalists for the United States
Pan American Games medalists in swimming
Medalists at the 1971 Pan American Games
20th-century American women
University of Cincinnati alumni
Swimmers from Cincinnati